"Oulhali" "(Say it to Me)" is a song by the Lebanese singer Amal Hijazi from her second studio album Zaman, released as a single in 2003. 

The song was a considerable success in several Arab countries, peaking at number one in countries like Lebanon and Egypt. In addition, the video was one of the most recognized of 2002. 

2003 singles
Amal Hijazi songs